Half Island Cove  is a community in the Canadian province of Nova Scotia, located in the Municipality of the District of Guysborough in Guysborough County on the shore of Chedabucto Bay.

The beach at Half Island Cove is one of the warmest beaches in Nova Scotia.

References
  Half Island Cove on Destination Nova Scotia

Communities in Guysborough County, Nova Scotia
General Service Areas in Nova Scotia